Liam McIlvanney is a Scottish-born crime fiction writer and academic at the University of Otago, New Zealand, and the inaugural holder of the Stuart Chair in Scottish studies at Otago. He is the son of William McIlvanney.

Works

Fiction
All the Colours of the Town (2009)
 Where the Dead Men Go (2013)
 The Quaker (2018)
 The Heretic (2022)

Nonfiction
 Burns the Radical: Poetry and Politics in Late Eighteenth-Century Scotland (2002)

Awards 

 The Saltire First Book Award
 Ngaio Marsh Award for Best New Zealand Crime Novel (2014)
 McIlvanney Prize for the Scottish Crime Book of the Year (2018)

References

External links 
 Author's website
 Author's page at Otago University

Living people
Scottish emigrants to New Zealand
Scottish mystery writers
Academic staff of the University of Otago
Year of birth missing (living people)
21st-century Scottish novelists
21st-century British male writers
Scottish male novelists